The Kelly Clarkson Show is an American daytime television variety talk show hosted by American singer Kelly Clarkson. It is produced and distributed by NBCUniversal Syndication Studios and features Clarkson interviewing celebrities and segments about "everyday people". Clarkson opens the program with "Kellyoke", a musical performance of a cover version of various songs requested by a member of her audience and ends with her participating in an activity with her guests. "Kellyoke" classic was introduced in season 3, where Clarkson performs her own songs that were not released as singles.

The series premiered on September 9, 2019, in first-run syndication, with NBC Owned Television Stations serving as its main affiliate base. Filming takes place at the Universal Studios Lot in California. 

The Kelly Clarkson Show has earned thirteen Daytime Emmy Awards, including Outstanding Talk Show Entertainment, as well as Clarkson winning Outstanding Entertainment Talk Show Host in 2020, 2021, and 2022.

Concept

The program's press release states that "In her new daytime talk show, Kelly Clarkson uses her gift of connection to bring viewers something new: a fun, energetic show that breaks with tradition. In each episode audiences will experience an hour full of remarkable stories, celebrity guests, spontaneous surprises, humor, heart and, of course, good music. It's like a weekday brunch party with a fascinating guest list of people who would otherwise never meet." Clarkson usually performs a cover song in each episode.

Production
Paul Telegdy, who was NBCUniversal's president of Alternative Programming, had originally scouted Clarkson to serve as a mentor—and later a coach—on NBC's music competition series The Voice. As part of a corporate restructuring, Telegdy additionally became the head of NBCUniversal's syndication division in late 2016.

Despite being reluctant at first, Clarkson accepted the offer for the series in an effort to "connect with people, play games, music and find ways to help or give back to communities/organizations." She also sought advice from various television presenters, including Jimmy Fallon, Ellen DeGeneres, and Blake Shelton. On August 6, 2018, it was reported by Broadcasting & Cable that Clarkson had filmed a pilot for the talk show that was later offered for syndication, broadcast on another platform, or both. Celebrities such as Josh Groban, Terry Crews, and Chloë Grace Moretz were reported to have participated as her guests on the pilot. She is also accompanied by her touring band for her musical performances in the program, which includes a barn-like studio as a reflection to her "country roots". Clarkson also revealed the talk show will be opened by audience-requested covers of various songs.

On September 19, 2018, NBC Owned Television Stations announced that it had picked up the program; it replaced Steve Harvey's eponymous talk show on most NBC owned-and-operated stations, with a number of stations owned by E. W. Scripps Company likewise using it as a replacement for that station group's Pickler & Ben. Alex Duda, previously a showrunner of The Tyra Banks Show and Harvey's 2012–2017 talk show, was commissioned to be the program's executive producer. In November 2019, the series was renewed for a second season, which premiered on September 21, 2020.

Midway through the first season, production on the show was suspended on March 13, 2020, after the World Health Organization announced the beginning of the COVID-19 pandemic in the United States. The show resumed production in April of the same year, with multiple episodes being recorded from Clarkson's home in Montana, then later at her Southern California home. The show continued in production for its first season into August, when traditionally, most syndicated talk shows are dark. Clarkson returned to studio-shot shows in September 2020, with a virtual studio audience.

On December 15, 2020, the show was renewed for its third and fourth seasons through 2023. The third season premiered on September 13, 2021. The new season marked the return of the live studio audience. The first week of shows for the third season were taped in New York City. The fourth season premiered on September 12, 2022. On November 7, 2022, the show was renewed for its fifth and sixth seasons through 2025.

Episodes

Broadcast
For its first season, The Kelly Clarkson Show was commissioned for broadcast in virtually all television markets in the United States, with the NBC Owned Television Stations serving as its primary affiliate base, along with the Citytv television system in Canada. The affiliate base also includes stations affiliated with other networks besides NBC. On most NBC stations, it is positioned as a lead-in program to The Ellen DeGeneres Show, or as a centerpiece program leading into local afternoon newscasts. The series also airs the same day on Bravo as part of its overnight programming, while NBC stations and affiliates carrying The Kelly Clarkson Show also have the option to carry a late-night repeat in lieu of a network broadcast of NBC News Now's Top Story with Tom Llamas. In May 2021, the NBC Owned Television Stations group announced that the show will take over the timeslot of The Ellen DeGeneres Show on the ten NBC-owned stations that carry both programs, after Ellen final season reruns ended at the start of September 2022.

Outside of North America, the Philippines' TAP TV, South Africa's M-Net West, Ireland's Virgin Media Two, and Singapore's Channel 5 carry the program. Starting on January 15, 2023, the show begin airing in Australia on the new 7Bravo network.

Kellyoke

Kellyoke is a covers extended play (EP) by Kelly Clarkson, based on the word “karaoke” combined with her name. Kellyoke is originally the name of a segment from her daytime talk show; during that portion of the show, Kelly and her band perform various song covers (shortened for television) by artists who inspired her personally - thus she calls the segment Kellyoke. She has performed songs by artists such as Mariah Carey, The Staples Singers, The Chicks, and Nat King Cole, among many others. 

The EP was released on June 9, 2022, through Atlantic Records.

Track listing

Charts

Reception

Ratings
On its pilot week, The Kelly Clarkson Show premiered with over 2.6 million viewers and a 1.6 household rating according to Nielsen Media Research—the best premiere rating for a new first-run syndicated program since Katie in 2012.

Accolades

|-
! rowspan=9|2020
| Critics' Choice Television Awards
| Best Talk Show
| rowspan=2| The Kelly Clarkson Show
| 
|
|-
| rowspan=7| Daytime Emmy Awards
| Outstanding Talk Show Entertainment
| 
| rowspan=7|
|-
| Outstanding Entertainment Talk Show Host
| Kelly Clarkson
| 
|-
| Outstanding  Directing in a Talk, Entertainment, News, or Morning Program
| Joseph C. Terry
| 
|-
| Outstanding Lighting Direction
| Darren Langer
| 
|-
| Art Direction/Set Decoration/Scenic Design
| Kevin Grace, Emily Auble, James Connelly, David Eckert
| 
|-
| Outstanding Technical Team
| rowspan="2"|The Kelly Clarkson Show
| 
|-
| Outstanding Live and Direct-to-Tape Sound Mixing
| 
|-
| People's Choice Awards
| The Daytime Talk Show of 2020
| rowspan="2"|The Kelly Clarkson Show
| 
|
|-
! rowspan="12"|2021
| Critics' Choice Television Awards
| Best Talk Show
| 
|
|-
| Iris Awards
| Award for Excellence in Performance
| Kelly Clarkson
| 
|
|-
| rowspan="2"|Make-Up Artists & Hair Stylists Guild Awards
| Best Hair Styling, Daytime Television
| Roberto Ramos, Tara Copeland
| 
| rowspan="2"|
|-
|Best Make-Up, Daytime Television
|Jason McGlothin, Gloria Elias-Foeillet, Chanty LaGrana, Josh Foster
|
|-
| rowspan="6"|Daytime Emmy Awards
| Outstanding Talk Show Entertainment
| The Kelly Clarkson Show
| 
| rowspan="6"|
|-
| Outstanding Entertainment Talk Show Host
| Kelly Clarkson
| 
|-
| Outstanding Original Song
| "Cabana Boy Troy"
| 
|-
| Outstanding Lighting Direction
| Darren Langer
| 
|-
| Outstanding Live and Direct to Tape Sound Mixing
| The Kelly Clarkson Show
| 
|-
| Art Direction/Set Decoration/Scenic Design
| Kevin Grace, Emily Auble, James Connelly, David Eckert
| 
|-
| Gracie Awards
| Best Talk Show: Entertainment
| rowspan="3"|The Kelly Clarkson Show
| 
| 
|-
| People's Choice Awards
| The Daytime Talk Show of 2021
| 
|
|-
! rowspan=14|2022
| Critics' Choice Television Awards
| Best Talk Show
| 
|
|-
| rowspan=2|MTV Movie & TV Awards
| Best Talk/Topical Show
| The Kelly Clarkson Show
| 
| rowspan=2|
|-
| Best Host
|Kelly Clarkson
| 
|-
| rowspan=9|Daytime Emmy Awards
| Outstanding Talk Show Entertainment
| The Kelly Clarkson Show
| 
| rowspan=2|
|-
| Outstanding Entertainment Talk Show Host
| Kelly Clarkson
| 
|-
| Outstanding Directing Team For A Multiple Camera Daytime Nom-Fiction Program
| Joe Terry, Diana Horn, Chris Hines, Ran Lowe 
| 
| rowspan=7|
|-
| Outstanding Music Direction and Composition 
| Jason Halbert
| 
|-
| Outstanding Lighting Direction
| Darren Langer 
| 
|-
| Outstanding Technical Team, Camera Work, Video
| Tom Henson, Dick Mort, Dean Andersen, Richard Pitpit, Eric Taylor, Drew Jansen, Ralph Bolton, Wade Bobbit
| 
|-
| Outstanding Multiple Camera Editing 
| Justin Curran, Stas Lipovetskiy, Kliff Svatos, Sam Goldfein, Casey O'Brien
| 
|-
| Outstanding Live Sound Mixing and Sound Editing 
| James Slanger, Bob Lewis, Eddie Marquez, Robert Venable, Danny Cruz, Jennifer Vannoy-Rounsaville, Jeff Hickman, Kevin Shannon
| 
|-
| Outstanding Art Direction/Set Decorating/Scenic Design 
| James Pearse Connelly, David Eckert, Kevin Grace
| 
|-
| Critics' Choice Real TV Awards
| Female Star of the Year
| Kelly Clarkson 
| 
|
|-
| People's Choice Awards
| The Daytime Talk Show of 2022
| rowspan=2| The Kelly Clarkson Show
| 
| 
|-
! rowspan=2|2023
| Critics' Choice Television Awards
| Best Talk Show
|
|
|-
| GLAAD Media Awards
| Outstanding Variety or Talk Show Episode 
| Episode: "Spirit Day"
| 
| 
|}

References

External links

 
2010s American television talk shows
2019 American television series debuts
2020s American television talk shows
Daytime Emmy Award for Outstanding Talk Show winners
English-language television shows
First-run syndicated television programs in the United States
Kelly Clarkson
Television productions suspended due to the COVID-19 pandemic
Television series by Universal Television
Television shows filmed in California
Television shows filmed in Los Angeles